Walter Gadsby (1872 – after 1897) was an English professional footballer who played in the Football League for Small Heath.

Born in Bromsgrove, Worcestershire, he played local football for Astwood Bank and Redditch Excelsior before signing for Small Heath. Despite scoring twice on his Second Division debut, on 13 February 1897 in a 6–2 win at Burton Wanderers, and solid performances in the reserves, Gadsby played little first-team football. In 1898 he joined Watford before returning to his former club Redditch Excelsior.

References

1872 births
Year of death missing
Sportspeople from Bromsgrove
English footballers
Association football forwards
Birmingham City F.C. players
Watford F.C. players
English Football League players
Date of birth missing
Place of death missing